Valtteri Puustinen (born 4 June 1999) is a Finnish professional ice hockey winger currently playing with the Wilkes-Barre/Scranton Penguins in the American Hockey League (AHL) as a prospect under contract to the Pittsburgh Penguins of the National Hockey League (NHL).

Playing career
Puustinen played as a youth within the HPK organization of the Finnish Liiga. He was drafted 203rd overall by the Pittsburgh Penguins in the 2019 NHL Entry Draft.

Puustinen made his Liiga debut for HPK during the 2018–19 Liiga season. He played 47 regular season games and scored 10 goals.

In the 2020–21 season with HPK, Puustinen recorded 21 goals and 20 assists for 41 points in 51 games. His 21 goals led all HPK skaters and were tied for eighth in the league. He was one of just four skaters in Liiga to record 20 or more goals and assists.

On 6 May 2021, Puustinen was signed by the Pittsburgh Penguins to a two-year, entry-level contract. After scoring 17 goals and assists each with the Penguins' American Hockey League affiliate, Puustinen was called up by the Penguins and played his first National Hockey League game on 11 March 2022 against the Vegas Golden Knights. He scored his first NHL point that night, a secondary assist on Jeff Carter's goal, as the Penguins won 5-2.

Career statistics

Regular season and playoffs

International

References

External links

1999 births
Living people
Finnish ice hockey forwards
HPK players
People from Kuopio
Pittsburgh Penguins draft picks
Pittsburgh Penguins players
Wilkes-Barre/Scranton Penguins players
Sportspeople from North Savo